Francisco Javier Iribarne Fernandez (born 13 July 1998) is a Spanish volleyball player for Unicaja Almería Voleibol and the Spanish national team.

He participated at the 2017 Men's European Volleyball Championship.

References

1998 births
Living people
Spanish men's volleyball players
Competitors at the 2018 Mediterranean Games
Mediterranean Games silver medalists for Spain
Mediterranean Games medalists in volleyball